Thain is a name.

Surname
Notable people with the surname include:
Bradley Thain (born 1997), South African rugby union player
Caryl Thain (1895–1969), English cricketer
Colin Thain (born 1959), political scientist
Gary Thain (1948–1975), musician
Gillian Stroudley (née Thain, 1925–1992), English painter and printmaker.
James Thain (1921–1975), British aviator, pilot in the 1958 Munich air disaster 
John Thain (born 1955), businessman
John Thain (footballer) (1903–1977), English professional footballer
Kevin Thain (born 1969), shinty player
Thomas Thain (died 1832), politician

Given name
Notable people with the given name include:
Thain Simon (1922–2007), ice hockey player
Thain Wendell MacDowell (1890–1960), recipient of the Victoria Cross

See also

Thain (Middle-earth), fictional title
Thane (disambiguation)
Thein
Thegn